Vinich Chareonsiri (born 10 August 1936) is a Thai former sports shooter. He competed in the 50 metre rifle three positions event at the 1968 Summer Olympics.

References

External links
 

1936 births
Living people
Vinich Chareonsiri
Vinich Chareonsiri
Shooters at the 1968 Summer Olympics
Vinich Chareonsiri